Mate Šestan (born 12 February 1971) is a retired football player, born in Croatia.

Career
He has played as a forward for numerous clubs, including Swedish Hammarby IF, Danish F.C. Copenhagen, Spanish Levante UD, Xiamen Xiaxin. Known for his fiery temper, he scored 7 goals in 35 games for Copenhagen.

References

External links
 

1971 births
Living people
Association football forwards
Croatian footballers
NK Zadar players
NK Dubrava players
NK Zagreb players
NK Neretva players
NK Marsonia players
F.C. Copenhagen players
Levante UD footballers
Hammarby Fotboll players
Xiamen Blue Lions players
Yanbian Funde F.C. players
HNK Šibenik players
Croatian Football League players
Danish Superliga players
Segunda División players
Allsvenskan players
Croatian expatriate footballers
Expatriate men's footballers in Denmark
Croatian expatriate sportspeople in Denmark
Expatriate footballers in Spain
Croatian expatriate sportspeople in Spain
Expatriate footballers in Sweden
Croatian expatriate sportspeople in Sweden
Expatriate footballers in China
Croatian expatriate sportspeople in China